Kill It is a 2019 South Korean television series starring Jang Ki-yong and Nana. It aired on OCN from March 23 to April 28, 2019.

Synopsis
A passionate animal lover and skilled veterinarian, no one would suspect that Kim Soo-hyun (Jang Ki-yong) is actually one of the most lethal men in the world.  Using his facade as a defender of animals to hide his true identity, Kim Soo-hyun has forged a reputation between the worst of the worst as the epitome of precision, skill and, above all, anonymity.  A complete mystery, he is a ghost, a shadow, a lethal whisper, hired by individuals and organizations around the world to deal with problems that only he is capable of dealing with. On the opposite extreme, is Do Hyun-jin (Nana), a tenacious detective whose external cold image hides an empathic soul.  Using an effective combination of skill and instinct, Do Hyun-jin ends up working on a case that leads her directly to Kim Soo-hyun. Believing that he is the serial killer she seeks, Do Hyun-jin thoroughly investigates the identity and past of Kim Soo-hyun, but what she finds shakes her to the bone.  Now, bound by fate, Do Hyun-jin and Kim Soo-hyun set out to solve the mystery that linked them years ago.

Cast

Main
 Jang Ki-yong as Kim Soo-hyun
 Moon Woo-jin as young Soo-hyun
A skilled killer that many gangs seek and a veterinarian.
 Nana as Do Hyun-jin / Lee Young-eun
A detective who graduated at the top of her class at the police academy and who tries to find her past lover's murderer.

Supporting

People around Soo-hyun
 Roh Jeong-eui as Min Ji/Kang Seul-gi
 Joo Ye-rim as young Seul-gi
 Lee Jae-won as Ahn Philip
Soo-hyun's hitman broker.
 David Lee McInnis as Pavel

At Seoul Police Station
 Kim Hyun-mok as Lee Yoon Seung
Hyun-jin's junior detective
 Ji Il-joo as Yoon Jung-woo
A prosecutor and a gamer.
 Kwak Ja-hyung as Park Sung-ho
An assistant Inspector
 Ahn Se-ho as Jang Gwang-joon
Medical Examiner.
 Park Geun-soo as Lee Sang-yeon

People around Hyun-jin
Jung Hae-kyun as Do Jae-hwan
Hyun-jin's father
 Jung Jae-eun as Jung So-yeon
Hyun-jin's mother
 Kim Joo-hun as Min-hyuk
Nana's (Do Hyun-jin) ex-boyfriend. He was a witness to Seul-gi grandfather's 'Kim Il-ho murder case' and a reporter who died in a mysterious way.

Others
 Robin Deiana as Karimov II
 Jo Han-chul as Go Hyun-woo
 Ok Go-woon as Yoon Ji-hye
 Jeon Jin-gi as Joo Young-hoon
 Kim Sun-bin as Jeon Yong-ki
 Son Kwang-eop as Seo Won-suk

Production
 Early working title of the series is Blue Eyes.
 The first script reading was held in January 2019.

Controversy
Kill It was supposed to be produced by BaramiBunda Inc., but the company's CEO Cho Jung-ho was accused of embezzlement. Studio Dragon and Crave Works later assumed production duties.

Original Soundtrack

Part 1

Part 2

Part 3

Part 4

Part 5

Part 6

Ratings

Notes

References

External links
  

 

OCN television dramas
Television series by Studio Dragon
Korean-language television shows
South Korean thriller television series
2019 South Korean television series debuts
2019 South Korean television series endings
Works about the Russian Mafia